Adhu is a 2004 Tamil-language horror film directed by Ramesh Balakrishnan, starring Sneha as a spirit possessed girl. The film, that has Aravind, a newcomer, Suha, Kazan Khan and Vijayan in supporting and Abbas in a cameo role, is a remake of the 2002 Hong Kong-Thai-Singaporean film The Eye. The film, with music scored by Yuvan Shankar Raja and cinematography by P. Selvakumar, released on 15 October 2004 and received generally negative reviews and is considered a box-office disaster.

Plot

Meera (Sneha) is transplanted with the eyes of Kayalvizhi (Suha) which enables her to see able to see "things" not visible to other's eyes. Haunted and harassed by Kayalvizhi's Spirit, Meera goes all the way to Vijayanagaram to get to the bottom of the intrigue, because the spirit orders her to do so getting to know of Kayalvizhi's story and the injustice done to her by the village head (Vijayan). The spirit of Kayalvizhi seeks revenge and retribution. How it achieves this forms the story

Cast
 Sneha as Meera
 Aravind as Arvind
 Suha as Kayalvizhi
 Kazan Khan
 Vijayan
 Saranya as Meera's mother
 Shanmugarajan as Muthu
Aryan as sorcerer
 Abbas as Doctor Raj (cameo)

Music
The film score was composed by Yuvan Shankar Raja, which was said to be one of the few highlights of the film. The film has only one song, a soundtrack was not released.

References

External links

2004 films
Indian horror films
2000s Tamil-language films
Films scored by Yuvan Shankar Raja
Indian horror film remakes
Indian remakes of Hong Kong films
Films directed by Ramesh Balakrishnan
2004 horror films